Ghegheto Island, also known as Round Island, is an island in Lake Huron, about  from the coast near Howdenvale, Ontario. It sits on a shallow shoal that also includes Cavalier Island, and which can pose a danger to ship navigation. Collectively, the small islands in this area are known as the Fishing Islands.

Captain Bayfield, who charted the Bruce Peninsula in 1822, named the island after his Ojibwe assistant Ogima Ghegeto.

References

Bibliography
 
 

Lake islands of Ontario
Islands of Lake Huron in Ontario